Andrew John Procter (born 13 March 1983) is an English former professional footballer who played as a midfielder. He made one appearance for the England C national team.

Career
The highlight of his career came on 28 April 2007 in a crucial League Two six-pointer with Macclesfield Town. Procter scored two goals in a 3–2 victory which secured Stanley's Football League status in their first season back after promotion from the Conference.

He studied at the University of Salford on a part-time basis for a degree in Physiotherapy, a programme he decided to follow after suffering a cruciate knee ligament injury in 2005.

Procter signed for Preston North End on 20 January 2012 and was announced captain on his arrival and he received a new two-year deal on 1 July 2012. He scored his first goal for the club against future club Bury in a Football League Trophy tie on 18 December 2012. After 23 league appearances, 17 of them coming from the bench he decided to cancel his contract via mutual consent with the Lilywhites after 18 months of service.

After a week without a club Procter joined Bury on a free transfer penning a two-year deal with the Shakers. In his first season at Bury he made 28 appearances in all competitions. In his second season at Bury he was put on the transfer list along with Ashley Grimes after being seen as surplus to requirements. On 1 September 2014, he had his contract cancelled because Procter wanted to leave Bury.

Procter rejoined Accrington Stanley on 1 September. He competed against the likes of Luke Joyce and Josh Windass in 2014–15 season.

Career statistics

Honours
Accrington Stanley
Northern Premier League (VI): 2003
Conference National (V): 2006

References

External links

1983 births
Living people
Footballers from Blackburn
English footballers
England semi-pro international footballers
Association football midfielders
Great Harwood Town F.C. players
Accrington Stanley F.C. players
Preston North End F.C. players
Bury F.C. players
English Football League players
National League (English football) players
Alumni of the University of Salford
Wigan Athletic F.C. non-playing staff
Blackburn Rovers F.C. non-playing staff